Apache C++ Standard Library project (code name stdcxx) is a set of classes and functions, which are written in the core language.

Purpose 
The Standard Library provides several generic containers, functions to utilise and manipulate these containers, function objects, generic strings and streams (including interactive and file I/O), support for some language features, and everyday functions for tasks such as finding the square root of a number. The goal of the Apache C++ Standard Library is to provide a free, open source implementation of the ISO/IEC 14882 international standard for C++ with cross-platform library, portability and consistent behavior.

History 
In summer of 2005, Rogue Wave Software donated its commercial source code to Apache Software Foundation. After more than five years without a release, the board of the Apache Software Foundation decided to end this project and move it to Apache Attic. This move occurred on May 15, 2014.

Key features 
The key features of the stdcxx project at the time of submission include:
Full conformance to the C++ Standard Library
Complete implementation of the internationalization and localization library independent of the underlying operating system, including a large set of locale definition files, character set description files, and utility programs to process these files and generate locale databases
User control over strict or permissive conformance checking
Thread-safe implementation of strings, iostreams, and locales
Reference counted basic_string implementation using atomic locking with the ability to switch to a non-reference counted implementation
Excellent runtime performance
Optimized for fast compiles and very small executable file sizes
Portable to and fully tested on a large set of operating systems, including AIX, HP-UX, Linux, Solaris, Windows, etc.
Portable to most leading commercial as well as open source compilers
Debugging facilities such as safe iterators, precondition and postcondition checking, and the ability to generate stack traces
Fully documented configuration and build infrastructure
Thorough, well-maintained documentation
Ten years of deployment in the world's most critical enterprise systems

See also
C++ Standard Library
Standard Template Library
Apache Portable Runtime

References

External links

ISO/IEC 14882 C++ Standard Library

C++ libraries
Software using the Apache license